The Great Kai & J. J. is an album by American jazz trombonists Kai Winding and J. J. Johnson featuring performances recorded in 1960 as the first release for the Impulse! label (A-1 for the mono LP, AS-1 for the stereo one).

Reception
The Penguin Guide comments that this release, recorded in 1960, "was a commercially motivated reunion, some time after the partnership had been amicably dissolved." It goes on to compliment the musicianship, paying particular notice to Bill Evans' playing, which gives it the feel of "a proper group project rather than a trombone feature with accompaniment."
Scott Yanow of AllMusic stated "the music still sounds fresh and lively".

Track listing
 "This Could Be the Start of Something Big" (Steve Allen) — 3:13
 "Georgia on My Mind" (Hoagy Carmichael, Stuart Gorrell) — 3:52
 "Blue Monk" (Monk) — 4:31
 "Judy" (J. J. Johnson) — 4:06
 "Alone Together" (Howard Dietz, Arthur Schwartz) — 3:36
 "Side by Side" (Harry M. Woods) — 3:06
 "I Concentrate on You" (Porter) — 4:03
 "Theme from Picnic" (Allen, Duning) — 4:05
 "Trixie" (Johnson) — 5:10
 "Going, Going, Gong!" (Winding) — 3:11
 "Just for a Thrill" (Lil Hardin Armstrong, Don Raye) — 3:19

Recorded on October 3, 1960 (track 1), November 2, 1960 (tracks 3, 6, 7), November 4, 1960 (tracks 5, 8, 10, 11) and November 8, 1960 (tracks 2, 4, 9)

Personnel
J. J. Johnson, Kai Winding – trombone
Bill Evans – piano
Paul Chambers (tracks 1, 3, 6, 7); Tommy Williams (tracks 2, 4, 5 & 8-11) – bass
Roy Haynes (tracks 1, 3, 6, 7); Art Taylor (tracks 2, 4, 5 & 8-11) – drums

References

Impulse! Records albums
J. J. Johnson albums
Kai Winding albums
1961 albums
Albums produced by Creed Taylor
Albums recorded at Van Gelder Studio